Colombia Pacto por el Deporte is a Colombian UCI Continental road cycling team founded in 2020.

Team roster

Major wins
2021
Stage 1 Vuelta a Colombia, Nelson Soto
Stage 8 Vuelta a Colombia, Darwin Atapuma
Stage 9 Vuelta a Colombia, Óscar Quiroz
Giro del Medio Brenta, Didier Merchán
 Road race, Pan American Road Championships, Nelson Soto

References

External links

UCI Continental Teams (America)
Cycling teams established in 2020
Cycling teams based in Colombia